Lake Babati is a lake in Tanzania known for its population of hippos. Recent droughts have led to a drop in the number of sightings of hippos, causing concern for local hoteliers.

The lake is located near Babati town, in the Babati Urban District of Manyara Region.

References

Babati
Geography of Manyara Region
Babati District
Tourist attractions in the Manyara Region